Worden is an unincorporated community in Klamath County, Oregon, United States.

The townsite of Worden was purchased and laid out by William S. Worden, a member of a family of early Klamath County settlers. William Worden was a right-of-way agent for the Southern Pacific Railroad (SP) during the time SP predecessor Oregon Eastern Railway was building a railroad into Klamath Falls. He was later elected Klamath County judge. Worden station near Dallas in Polk County on the SP Falls City Line may have also been named for William Worden. Worden post office was established in 1910.

As of 1990, Worden had a 24-hour café and truck stop.

References

External links
Image of Worden from Flickr
Image of grain elevator in Worden from Panoramio

Unincorporated communities in Klamath County, Oregon
1910 establishments in Oregon
Populated places established in 1910
Unincorporated communities in Oregon